Ramón Rodrigo de Freitas  or simply  Ramón  (born April 7, 1983 in Belo Horizonte), is a Brazilian attacking midfielder who was last played for Goiás.

In March 2009 he signed a two-year contract with Coritiba. On July 27, 2009, he was loaned to Hong Kong First Division League giant South China for 2009-10 season. On November 4, 2009, he was released by South China and returned to Coritiba.

Honours
Grêmio
Campeonato Gaúcho: 2006, 2008

Goiás
Campeonato Goiano: 2012, 2013
Campeonato Brasileiro Série B: 2012

Career Statistics in Hong Kong

South China Athletic Association
As of 31 October 2009

External links
 sambafoot
 Guardian Stats Centre
 globoesporte
 zerozero.pt

1983 births
Living people
Brazilian footballers
Campeonato Brasileiro Série A players
Campeonato Brasileiro Série B players
América Futebol Clube (MG) players
Grêmio Foot-Ball Porto Alegrense players
South China AA players
Expatriate footballers in Hong Kong
Hong Kong First Division League players
Brazilian expatriate sportspeople in Hong Kong
Coritiba Foot Ball Club players
Botafogo Futebol Clube (SP) players
Goiás Esporte Clube players
Association football midfielders
Footballers from Belo Horizonte